Fejsal Mulić (Serbian Cyrillic: Фејсал Мулић; born 3 October 1994) is a Serbian professional footballer who plays as a forward for K League 1 club Suwon Samsung Bluewings.

Club career
Born in Novi Pazar, Mulić began his career in his native Serbia, playing for the young team of Novi Pazar. In 2012, he made his debut with Novi Pazar in the 2011–12 Serbian SuperLiga playing against Jagodina.

After having played for 1860 Munich II since 2013, Mulić made his debut for 1860 Munich on 22 November 2014 being substituted in the 88th minute for Rubin Okotie at a 4–1 away win against Union Berlin. He scored his first goal for 1860 Munich on 8 August 2015 in the first round of the DFB-Pokal against Hoffenheim, when he brought his team to a 2–0 victory in the 93rd minute. Mulić was released by 1860 Munich on 19 January 2016.

During his first game with Royal Excel Mouscron, he entered at the 57th minute and scored his first goal in the Belgian First Division A in the 89th minute against Lokeren. On 13 July 2017, Mulić signed with Hapoel Acre of the Israeli Premier League. He then joined Hapoel Tel Aviv, and later on was sent on a loan to Bnei Yehuda. On 12 July 2019, he joined Slovenian PrvaLiga club Mura.

On 4 July 2020, Mulić signed a contract with Bosnian Premier League club Velež Mostar. He made his official debut for Velež in a league match against Željezničar on 1 August 2020. Mulić scored his first goal for Velež in a Mostar derby win against Zrinjski Mostar.

On 19 January 2021, he signed a contract with K League 1 club Seongnam for an undisclosed transfer fee.

On 7 February 2023, Mulić joined fellow South Korean club Suwon Samsung Bluewings for an undisclosed fee.

International career
Mulić made his international debut for the Serbia U21 national team against Lithuania on 8 September 2015. After that game, he would go on to make two more appearances, scoring one goal.

References

External links

1994 births
Living people
Sportspeople from Novi Pazar
Serbian footballers
Serbia under-21 international footballers
Serbian expatriate footballers
Association football forwards
FK Novi Pazar players
TSV 1860 Munich II players
TSV 1860 Munich players
Royal Excel Mouscron players
Hapoel Acre F.C. players
Hapoel Tel Aviv F.C. players
Bnei Yehuda Tel Aviv F.C. players
NŠ Mura players
FK Velež Mostar players
Seongnam FC players
Serbian SuperLiga players
Regionalliga players
2. Bundesliga players
Belgian Pro League players
Israeli Premier League players
Liga Leumit players
Slovenian PrvaLiga players
Premier League of Bosnia and Herzegovina players
K League 1 players
Serbian expatriate sportspeople in Germany
Serbian expatriate sportspeople in Belgium
Serbian expatriate sportspeople in Israel
Serbian expatriate sportspeople in Slovenia
Serbian expatriate sportspeople in Bosnia and Herzegovina
Serbian expatriate sportspeople in South Korea
Expatriate footballers in Germany
Expatriate footballers in Belgium
Expatriate footballers in Israel
Expatriate footballers in Slovenia
Expatriate footballers in Bosnia and Herzegovina
Expatriate footballers in South Korea